
Gmina Woźniki is an urban-rural gmina (administrative district) in Lubliniec County, Silesian Voivodeship, in southern Poland.

The gmina contains part of the protected area called Upper Liswarta Forests Landscape Park.

Villages
Apart from the town of Woźniki, Gmina Woźniki contains the villages and settlements of Babienica, Czarny Las, Dyrdy, Kamienica, Kamieńskie Młyny, Kolonia Woźnicka, Ligota Woźnicka, Lubsza, Mzyki, Niwy, Okrąglik, Piasek, Psary and Sośnica.

Neighbouring gminas
Gmina Woźniki is bordered by the towns of Kalety, Miasteczko Śląskie and Tarnowskie Góry, and by the gminas of Kamienica Polska, Konopiska, Koszęcin, Koziegłowy and Starcza.

Twin towns – sister cities

Gmina Woźniki is twinned with:
 Kravaře, Czech Republic
 Lisková, Slovakia

References

Wozniki
Lubliniec County